Soumili Biswas is a Bengali film and television actress, model, TV anchor, and a classical danseuse. Her first feature film, Alo, was released in 2003, where she plays a supporting role. She started as the anchor of non-fiction, student-based show in Tara Bangla named Syllabus-e nei. In 2007, she played the role of Durga in ETV Bangla's Durge Durgatinashini. She is currently serving as a mentor in Zee Bangla most popular Bengali Dance Reality Show Dance Bangla Dance Season 11.

She Joins Bharatiya Janata Party on 17 February 2021.

Personal life

She was born in Barisha/Behala, in south Kolkata, as the younger of two siblings. She has an elder brother, named Sujoy. She went to the Bidya Bharati Girls' School in Behala, Kolkata, and graduated in economics (honours) from the Jogamaya Devi College, a women's college of the University of Calcutta. She started training in Bharatnatyam from about the age of three, and received training under Thankamani Kutty and in ballet from Mamata Shankar. She regularly performs in dance dramas and in solo and group classical performances in Kolkata and elsewhere. She has received the Sangeet Ratna and the Sangeet Bibhakar awards in Bharatnatyam. She wed Ayan Ghosh, a banking professional in December 2012 in an arranged marriage.

Films

Alo (2003) - supporting
Gyarakal (2003) - Disha, supporting
Sangram (2005) - supporting
Asha (2006) - lead
Agnishapath (2006)
Bajimaat (2008) - supporting
U-Turn (2010) - lead
Agnisakshi (2011) - supporting
Teen Tanaya (2011) - supporting
Sudhu Tomake Chai (2013) - lead (Dipa)

Television
Jhum Ta Ra Ra (Zee Bangla)
Syllabus-e nei (Tara Bangla)
Kon Kanoner Phool (Zee Bangla)
Somoy (Ruposhi Bangla)
Byomkesh (Colors Bangla)
Joy Baba Lokenath (Zee Bangla) (later replaced by Srabanti Malakar)

Mahalaya
2007 ETV(Colors) Bangla Mahalaya Devi Mahisasurmardini
2008 DD Bangla Mahalaya Devi Mahisasurmardini

Reality Shows
 Rannaghor (Zee Bangla)
Didi No. 1 (Zee Bangla)
Dance Bangla Dance as Mentor(Zee Bangla)

References

External links

Actresses in Bengali cinema
Living people
Actresses from Kolkata
Bengali television actresses
Jogamaya Devi College alumni
University of Calcutta alumni
Indian television actresses
Indian film actresses
Female models from Kolkata
21st-century Indian actresses
Year of birth missing (living people)